Shockey Peak is a 2,010 m tall peak, rising 2 miles (3.2 km) southeast of Allen Peak near the north extremity of the main ridge of the Sentinel Range, Antarctica. It was discovered by Lincoln Ellsworth on his trans-Antarctic flight of November 23, 1935. It was named by the Advisory Committee on Antarctic Names (US-ACAN) for Charles C. Shockey of the Branch of Special Maps, U.S. Geological Survey, which prepared the 1962 map of this range.

Mountains of Ellsworth Land